David "Nino" Rodriguez (born September 18, 1977) is an American heavyweight boxer. He was formerly  ranked number 13 in the world by the WBC and number 12 by the WBA.

Boxing career 

Rodriguez had a previous unblemished record of 36-0 with 34 by knockout. His first round knockout ratio surpassed every heavyweight in history to date. During training for the first of his 2011 fights, Rodriguez survived a brutal knife attack, the result of which was a near-death experience and a facial scar that extends from his ear to his chin. Shortly thereafter, he also suffered an injury to his knee, sidetracking what was intended to be an career-defining year. His career eventually ended with a 37–2 record. David Rodriguez held the Texas Heavyweight title, New Mexico Heavyweight title, NABU Heavyweight title, NABA Heavyweight title as well as two of the WBC belts. After 16 months of retirement Nino finally returned November 21, 2015, with a 42-second 1st round win KO over Miguel Domingues of Brazil 23–4 with 21 knockouts.

Post Boxing Career 

Rodriguez has not since stepped back into the ring due to chronic back issues. Rodriguez is now seen occasionally on national television commentating Championship boxing. He is also an anti-bullying key note speaker and best selling author of the book "When The Lights Go Out". David has a subscription website, https://ninoscorner.tv/ where he discusses current events as well as his life history, both in and out of the ring. He uses humor and PG-13 language to inform and entertain his audiences. His YouTube channel has 245K subscribers and his Rumble channel has over 3,400 subscribers as of September 2022.

Personal life 

As far as his personal life, he tends to keep that private. He is single and not dating anyone as of September 2022. He has several pets, including a beloved dog named Axel. He is close to his parents in El Paso and to his family. He is also a practicing Christian; he attributes the turnaround of his alcoholism to his Christian faith. He does not like to travel much away from his home area due to post-2020 quarantine travel restrictions.

Professional boxing record 

|-
|align="center" colspan=8|37 Wins (35 knockouts), 2 Loss, 0 Draws
|-
| align="center" style="border-style: none none solid solid; background: #e3e3e3"|Result
| align="center" style="border-style: none none solid solid; background: #e3e3e3"|Record
| align="center" style="border-style: none none solid solid; background: #e3e3e3"|Opponent
| align="center" style="border-style: none none solid solid; background: #e3e3e3"|Type
| align="center" style="border-style: none none solid solid; background: #e3e3e3"|Round
| align="center" style="border-style: none none solid solid; background: #e3e3e3"|Date
| align="center" style="border-style: none none solid solid; background: #e3e3e3"|Location
| align="center" style="border-style: none none solid solid; background: #e3e3e3"|Notes
|-align=center
|Win
|37–2
|align=left| Gilberto Matheus Domingos
|TKO
|1 
|21/11/2015
|align=left| Complex Arena, Salt Lake City, United States
|align=left|
|-align=center
|Loss
|36–2
|align=left| Raymond Ochieng
|TKO
|1 
|18/07/2014
|align=left| Southwest University Event Center, El Paso, Texas, United States
|align=left|
|-align=center
|Loss
|36–1
|align=left| Darnell Wilson
|KO
|6 
|14/12/2013
|align=left| Resorts International, Atlantic City, New Jersey, United States
|align=left|
|-align=center
|Win
|36–0
|align=left| Byron Polley
|TKO
|2 
|03/12/2011
|align=left| Pan American Center, Las Cruces, New Mexico, United States
|align=left|
|-align=center
|Win
|35–0
|align=left| Owen Beck
|KO
|3 
|24/05/2011
|align=left| Don Haskins Convention Center, El Paso, Texas, United States
|align=left|
|-align=center
|Win
|34–0
|align=left| Matt Hicks
|TKO
|2 
|11/02/2011
|align=left| Don Haskins Convention Center, El Paso, Texas, United States
|align=left|
|-align=center
|Win
|33–0
|align=left| Daniel Bispo
|TKO
|2 
|27/03/2010
|align=left| Arena Monterrey, Monterrey, Nuevo León, Mexico
|align=left|
|-align=center
|Win
|32–0
|align=left| Robert Davis
|TKO
|3 
|12/09/2009
|align=left| Arena Monterrey, Monterrey, Nuevo León, Mexico
|align=left|
|-align=center
|Win
|31–0
|align=left| Manuel Pucheta
|TKO
|7 
|14/03/2009
|align=left| Auditorio Centenario, Torreon, Coahuila, Mexico
|align=left|
|-align=center
|Win
|30–0
|align=left| Marvin Ray Jones
|TKO
|1 
|22/11/2008
|align=left| Plaza de Toros, Monterrey, Nuevo León, Mexico
|align=left|
|-align=center
|Win
|29–0
|align=left| Andy Sample
|TKO
|1 
|27/09/2008
|align=left| Arena Mexico, Mexico City, Distrito Federal, Mexico
|align=left|
|-align=center
|Win
|28–0
|align=left| Josh Gutcher
|KO
|1 
|08/03/2008
|align=left| Plaza de Toros, Cancun, Quintana Roo, Mexico
|align=left|
|-align=center
|Win
|27–0
|align=left| Marcus McGee
|UD
|8
|21/12/2007
|align=left| Dickerson's Event Center, Las Cruces, New Mexico, United States
|align=left|
|-align=center
|Win
|26–0
|align=left| Rick Dyer
|TKO
|2 
|30/06/2007
|align=left| Don Haskins Convention Center, El Paso, Texas, United States
|align=left|
|-align=center
|Win
|25–0
|align=left| Marcus Rhode
|TKO
|3 
|19/05/2007
|align=left| Gypsy, Fayetteville, Arkansas, United States
|align=left|
|-align=center
|Win
|24–0
|align=left| Stacy Goodson
|TKO
|1 
|24/03/2007
|align=left| Oaks, Fort Smith, Arkansas, United States
|align=left|
|-align=center
|Win
|23–0
|align=left| John Turlington
|TKO
|2 
|17/08/2006
|align=left| Crowne Plaza Hotel, Houston, Texas, United States
|align=left|
|-align=center
|Win
|22–0
|align=left| Dan Whetzel
|TKO
|1 
|15/07/2006
|align=left| Fifth Third Ballpark, Comstock Park, Michigan, United States
|align=left|
|-align=center
|Win
|21–0
|align=left| Jeff Pegues
|KO
|1 
|27/05/2006
|align=left| Ramada Inn, Topeka, Kansas, United States
|align=left|
|-align=center
|Win
|20–0
|align=left| Brandon Quigley
|KO
|1 
|10/12/2005
|align=left| Legion Hall, Blairstown, Iowa, United States
|align=left|
|-align=center
|Win
|19–0
|align=left| John Turlington
|UD
|4
|09/04/2005
|align=left| Don Haskins Convention Center, El Paso, Texas, United States
|align=left|
|-align=center
|Win
|18–0
|align=left| Bryan Robinson
|TKO
|1 
|16/03/2005
|align=left| Waterloo, Iowa, United States
|align=left|
|-align=center
|Win
|17–0
|align=left| Travis Fulton
|TKO
|1 
|22/10/2004
|align=left| County Coliseum, El Paso, Texas, United States
|align=left|
|-align=center
|Win
|16–0
|align=left| Cruz Quintana
|TKO
|1 
|09/07/2004
|align=left| Don Haskins Convention Center, El Paso, Texas, United States
|align=left|
|-align=center
|Win
|15–0
|align=left| Jeff Lally
|TKO
|1 
|17/04/2004
|align=left| Pan American Center, Las Cruces, New Mexico, United States
|align=left|
|-align=center
|Win
|14–0
|align=left| Jason Curry
|KO
|1 
|27/02/2004
|align=left| Longshoremen's Hall, San Francisco, California, United States
|align=left|
|-align=center
|Win
|13–0
|align=left| Tommy Connelly
|KO
|1 
|07/11/2003
|align=left| Don Haskins Convention Center, El Paso, Texas, United States
|align=left|
|-align=center
|Win
|12–0
|align=left| Gary Butler
|TKO
|1 
|09/08/2003
|align=left| Rio Grande High School, Albuquerque, New Mexico, United States
|align=left|
|-align=center
|Win
|11–0
|align=left| Mike Parker
|KO
|1 
|21/06/2003
|align=left| Nuevo Laredo, Tamaulipas, Mexico
|align=left|
|-align=center
|Win
|10–0
|align=left| Ricky Jefferson
|KO
|1 
|19/04/2003
|align=left| Camel Rock Casino, Santa Fe, New Mexico, United States
|align=left|
|-align=center
|Win
|9–0
|align=left| Steve Shearburn
|KO
|1 
|13/02/2003
|align=left| Don Haskins Convention Center, El Paso, Texas, United States
|align=left|
|-align=center
|Win
|8–0
|align=left| Rex Jackson
|KO
|1 
|20/09/2002
|align=left| Cohen Stadium, El Paso, Texas, United States
|align=left|
|-align=center
|Win
|7–0
|align=left| Arthur Trass
|TKO
|1 
|10/05/2002
|align=left| El Paso County Coliseum, El Paso, Texas, United States
|align=left|
|-align=center
|Win
|6–0
|align=left| Clinton Whitehead
|KO
|1 
|08/02/2002
|align=left| Don Haskins Convention Center, El Paso, Texas, United States
|align=left|
|-align=center
|Win
|5–0
|align=left| Martin Lopez
|TKO
|3 
|10/06/2001
|align=left| Far West Rodeo, El Paso, Texas, United States
|align=left|
|-align=center
|Win
|4–0
|align=left| Victor Bursey
|KO
|1 
|02/06/2001
|align=left| Bricktown Hotel, Oklahoma City, Oklahoma, United States
|align=left|
|-align=center
|Win
|3–0
|align=left| Gerald Pond
|TKO
|1 
|15/05/1999
|align=left| Equestrian Center, El Paso, Texas, United States
|align=left|
|-align=center
|Win
|2–0
|align=left| David Valenzuela
|TKO
|1 
|21/01/1999
|align=left| Sheraton Hotel, Houston, Texas, United States
|align=left|
|-align=center
|Win
|1–0
|align=left| James Martin
|KO
|1 
|03/12/1998
|align=left| Sheraton Hotel, Houston, Texas, United States
|align=left|
|-align=center

References

External links
 
Doghouse article 2006
David Nino Rodriguez Interview
Nino's Corner

Living people
1977 births
Heavyweight boxers
American boxers of Mexican descent
American male boxers
People from El Paso, Texas